The Cohn House in Folsom, California is a building, in the Queen Anne Shingle Style of Victorian architecture, built in the 1890s in  Folsom, California.

The Cohn House was listed on the National Register of Historic Places in 1982.

The listing includes an original house built in the 1860s.

References

Houses on the National Register of Historic Places in California
Queen Anne architecture in California
Shingle Style houses
Houses completed in 1890
Victorian architecture in California
Houses in Sacramento County, California
Folsom, California
National Register of Historic Places in Sacramento County, California
Shingle Style architecture in California
1890s establishments in California